British Isles – A Natural History is an eight-part documentary series produced by the BBC Natural History Unit and presented by Alan Titchmarsh. Originally broadcast in the UK on BBC1 from September to November 2004, it took viewers on a journey from the formation of what is now the British Isles some 3 billion years ago to the present day, revealing how natural and human forces have shaped the landscape. Each of the 50-minute episodes was followed by a 10-minute short specific to each region of the British Isles. In 2007, the BBC made a companion series about British wildlife called The Nature of Britain, also presented by Titchmarsh.

A 3-disc Region 2 and 4 DVD set (BBCDVD1506) featuring all eight episodes was released on 29 November 2004. Titchmarsh wrote an accompanying book, also called British Isles: A Natural History, and released by BBC Books on 1 October 2004.

Filming
The four on board the aircraft were lightly injured.

References

External links
 
 
 

2004 British television series debuts
2004 British television series endings
2000s British documentary television series
BBC television documentaries
Nature educational television series
Ecology of the British Isles
Documentary films about prehistoric life